Sergei Skorykh (born 25 May 1984) is a Kazakh football midfielder.

Career statistics

Club

International

Statistics accurate as of match played 1 December 2014

References

External links

1981 births
Living people
Association football midfielders
Kazakhstani footballers
Kazakhstan international footballers
Kazakhstan Premier League players
FC Irtysh Pavlodar players
FC Tobol players
FC Zhetysu players
FC Taraz players
FC Kaisar players
FC Shakhter Karagandy players
People from Petropavl